Alicya Eyo (born 16 December 1975) is an English actress, best known for her roles as Denny Blood in the ITV prison drama series Bad Girls and Ruby Haswell in the ITV soap opera Emmerdale.

Early life
Eyo was born on 16 December 1975 in Huyton, Merseyside. Her mother, Sue, is a jazz singer. She grew up in the Toxteth area of Liverpool. Her love of drama started when she was nine, and she attended drama and dance classes every Saturday. When she was 14, she moved to London with her family. She trained at the Courtyard Theatre School.

Career

Early career
Eyo's first television appearance was in 1997, in Casualty, which was filmed earlier. She also made an appearance on Hetty Wainthropp Investigates and  appeared in Gold the follow up drama series to Band Of Gold as a young prostitute involved with Yardie gangsters who come over to Bradfords red light district from Leeds to clear up the Lane. In 1999, Eyo  appeared with Goldie in the David Bowie film Everybody Loves Sunshine known as B.U.S.T.E.D., internationally. She also starred in the movie G:MT - Greenwich Mean Time.
However, Eyo's big break came in 1998 when she was offered the part of Denny Blood, in Bad Girls.  The series was broadcast in June the following year when the UK viewing public first saw Eyo as Denny Blood in a pink PVC suit dancing to the N-Trance remix of Stayin' Alive by the Bee Gees.

Bad Girls
At the end of the sixth series (in which Eyo did not appear), the character of Denny Blood was voted the sixth favourite inmate on Bad Girls: Most Wanted. Denny's tragic upbringing, lead to the touching and tragic storylines with her mother, Jessie Devlin (played by Denise Black), and the relationship with stand-in mother Yvonne Atkins (Linda Henry). Blood also met the love of her life Shaz Wiley (Lindsey Fawcett), who died at the end of Series 4. Denny was devastated but found comfort in painting and was last seen being transferred to an open prison to serve the rest of her sentence. Just before Bad Girls was axed, the Bad Girls''' creators were going to ask Eyo to reprise her role as Denny.

During this time, Eyo also appeared in the film The Low Down, in an episode of Urban Gothic and in Tube Tales. Since leaving Bad Girls, Eyo appeared in Holby City twice, as two separate characters, and the BBC daytime drama Doctors. Eyo plays Gaynor Harvey in Shed Productions drama Bombshell. However, Bombshell still has not been shown in the UK, but has aired in New Zealand.

Theatre
Eyo has studied at the Court Theater Training Company and has been working professionally for 14 years.  Eyo has also performed at various theatres including the Royal Court Theatre, Nottingham.  She also performed in the critically acclaimed play Any Which Way.

Emmerdale
In October 2011, Eyo began appearing in Emmerdale'' as Ruby Haswell, the lesbian partner of Ali Spencer (Kelli Hollis). Eyo's role ended on 6 August 2015 when her character died in a helicopter crash.

Personal life
Eyo is a pescatarian. She is a supporter and patron of The Proud Trust, an LGBT charity that provides services and support for young people.

Filmography

References

External links
Official Alicya Eyo Website

1975 births
People from Huyton
Living people
English television actresses
Actresses from Liverpool
English soap opera actresses
English stage actresses
English film actresses
English lesbian actresses
English LGBT actors
20th-century English LGBT people
21st-century English LGBT people